Chiasmocleis is a genus of microhylid frogs. They are found in tropical South America north and east of the Andes. Their common name is humming frogs or silent frogs, the latter referring to the formerly recognized Syncope.

Taxonomy
There has been various attempts to delimit this genus in a way that would make it monophyletic. As of mid 2021, it is recognized as including the former Syncope, but consisting of three clades ranked as subgenera:

Of these, Relictocleis is the most divergent and may even be considered a separate, monotypic genus, with Relictocleis gnoma as its sole member.

Description
Chiasmocleis are small-bodied frogs with small limbs. They are sexually dimorphic, with males having darker chin, abundant to no dermal spines, and variable degree of pedal webbing. Subgenus Syncope is characterized by size reduction and reduction or loss of phalanges and digits. Also Relictocleis are particularly small.

Ecology
Chiasmocleis are fossorial or semi-fossorial and well camouflaged among the leaf litter or underground. They only forage on the surface for a few days during periods of explosive breeding at the beginning of the rainy season. They occur in both forested and open environments.

Species

The following species are recognised in the genus Chiasmocleis:

References

 
Microhylidae
Amphibian genera
Amphibians of South America
Taxa named by Lajos Méhelÿ